Mikalay Yanush (born 9 September 1984) is a Belarusian professional football coach and former player.

Career
He was a Belarusian Premier League top scorer in 2014 and 2015.

Yanush made his debut for the senior national side of his country on 30 March 2015 in a friendly match against Gabon.

Honours
Shakhtyor Soligorsk
Belarusian Cup winner: 2013–14, 2018–19

References

External links

1984 births
Living people
People from Luninets District
Sportspeople from Brest Region
Belarusian footballers
Association football forwards
Belarus international footballers
FC Granit Mikashevichi players
FC Dynamo Brest players
FC Shakhtyor Soligorsk players
FC Neman Grodno players
FC Isloch Minsk Raion players
Belarusian football managers